Akçayurt (Kurdish: Derno) is a village in the Hani District of Diyarbakır Province in Turkey.

Disappearance of the village muhtar Mehmet Gürkan in 1994 
A Kurdish muhtar (elected village head) after being released stated in a press statement that he had been tortured by Turkish gendarmes while in custody and forced to tell television journalists the PKK had burned his village, he stated when in fact it was the Turkish military who burned the village. On 18 August 1994 when returning to his village an eye-witness stated he was detained and taken via helicopter. He has not been seen since.

References

Villages in Hani District
Turkish Kurdistan